Glenwood Township is a township in Pope County, Minnesota, United States. The population was 1,004 at the 2000 census.

Glenwood Township was named for the glen and woods within its borders.

History 
The township was surveyed in 1859 and organized in 1866.

Geography

Demographics
As of the census of 2000, there were 1,004 people, 408 households, and 301 families residing in the township.  The population density was 25.0 people per square mile (9.7/km2).  There were 639 housing units at an average density of 15.9/sq mi (6.2/km2).  The racial makeup of the township was 98.61% White, 0.10% African American, 0.30% Native American, and 1.00% from two or more races. Hispanic or Latino of any race were 0.90% of the population.

There were 408 households, out of which 29.7% had children under the age of 18 living with them, 65.9% were married couples living together, 4.2% had a female householder with no husband present, and 26.2% were non-families. 23.8% of all households were made up of individuals, and 13.0% had someone living alone who was 65 years of age or older.  The average household size was 2.46 and the average family size was 2.92.

In the township the population was spread out, with 25.5% under the age of 18, 6.4% from 18 to 24, 21.8% from 25 to 44, 29.0% from 45 to 64, and 17.3% who were 65 years of age or older.  The median age was 43 years. For every 100 females, there were 103.2 males.  For every 100 females age 18 and over, there were 102.7 males.

The median income for a household in the township was $41,481, and the median income for a family was $44,605. Males had a median income of $31,042 versus $20,938 for females. The per capita income for the township was $26,117.  About 6.3% of families and 9.6% of the population were below the poverty line, including 12.6% of those under age 18 and 7.0% of those age 65 or over.

References

Townships in Pope County, Minnesota
Townships in Minnesota